Eugène Fromentin (24 October 182027 August 1876) was a French painter and writer, now better remembered for his writings.

Life
He was born in La Rochelle. After leaving school he studied for some years under Louis Cabat, the landscape painter. Fromentin was one of the earliest pictorial interpreters of Algeria, having been able, while quite young, to visit the land and people that suggested the subjects of most of his works, and to store his memory as well as his portfolio with the picturesque and characteristic details of North African life. In 1849, he was awarded a medal of the second class.

In 1852, he paid a second visit to Algeria, accompanying an archaeological mission, and then completed that minute study of the scenery of the country and of the habits of its people which enabled him to give to his after-work the realistic accuracy that comes from intimate knowledge.

His books include  ("The Masters of Past Time", 1876), an influential appreciation of Early Netherlandish painting and the Northern Baroque of the Old Masters of Belgium and Holland, Dominique and A Summer in the Sahara. In  he deals with the complexity of paintings by Rubens, Rembrandt and others, their style and the artists' emotions at the time of creating their masterpieces. He is also one of the first "art critics" to approach the subject of The Old Masters from a personal point of view – being a painter himself. He also puts the work in a social, political and economic context, as the Dutch Golden Age painting develops shortly after Holland won its independence.  The book developed from articles for journals. Meyer Schapiro has written an essay on Fromentin, "Eugene Fromentin as Critic".

His first great success was produced at the Salon of 1847, by the Gorges de la Chiffa. Among his more important works are:
  à Constantine (1849)
  (1853)
  (1859)
  (1859)
  (1859)
  (1861)
  (1863)
  (1863)
  (now at Luxembourg) (1863)
  (1865)
  (1867)
  (1868)
  (1869)
 Le Nil (1875)
  (1875)

Fromentin, who maintained that "art is the expression of the invisible by means of the visible", was much influenced in style by Eugène Delacroix. His works are distinguished by striking composition, great dexterity of handling and brilliancy of colour. In them is given with great truth and refinement the unconscious grandeur of barbarian and animal attitudes and gestures. His later works, however, show signs of an exhausted vein and of an exhausted spirit, accompanied or caused by physical enfeeblement.

But it must be observed that Fromentin's paintings show only one side of a genius that was perhaps even more felicitously expressed in literature, though with less profusion. Dominique, first published in the Revue des deux mondes in 1862, and dedicated to George Sand, is remarkable among the fiction of the century for delicate and imaginative observation and for emotional earnestness.

Fromentin's other literary works are Visites artistiques (1852); Simples Pèlerinages (1856); Un été dans le Sahara (1857); Une année dans le Sahel'' (1858). In 1876 he was an unsuccessful candidate for the Academy. He died suddenly at La Rochelle on 27 August 1876.

See also

 List of Orientalist artists
 Orientalism

References

Attribution:

External links 

 Encyclopædia Britannica
 
 
 www.eugenefromentin.org Works by Eugène Fromentin

19th-century French painters
French male painters
1820 births
1876 deaths
French male writers
Orientalist painters
19th-century French male artists